The Upper Mississippi River Valley AVA is an American Viticultural Area covering  located along the Upper Mississippi River and its tributaries in northwest Illinois, northeast Iowa, southeast Minnesota and southwest Wisconsin. Certified by the United States Department of the Treasury's Alcohol and Tobacco Tax and Trade Bureau on July 22, 2009, it is the largest AVA in the United States.   The AVA encompasses an area 50 times larger than the Bordeaux wine regions of France.

History
Grapes have been grown in Upper Mississippi River region since the earliest of times. The Vitis riparia is a grape native to the southern half of Minnesota and Wisconsin, where it flourishes along the many riverbanks of the Mississippi and its tributaries.  The native Sioux and Ojibwa ate the fresh berries and used the dry fruit in pemmican. They apparently did not, however, ferment the grapes into wine.  The early settlers called it the frost grape, as it was best when picked after the first hard frost.

With the influx of settlers in the 1840s and '50s, grape growing was tried along with all other horticultural pursuits. Varieties developed on the eastern seaboard such as the Concord were somewhat successful. The fruit was commercially used for fresh fruits or preserves. No wine was made except for personal use. However, these eastern varieties were not quite hardy enough and the coldest of winters, 
together with the growth of the California fresh fruit industry, eventually did the industry in. By the 1930s grape growing was limited to backyard vineyards for family use only.

The first winery in this region, Alexis Bailly Vineyard and Winery, was opened in 1973 near Hastings, Minnesota. At the time it was believed that this part of the Upper Mississippi Valley endured winters that were too cold to sustain viticulture.

Climate and geography
The climate of the Upper Mississippi Valley is continental and cool. The rolling hills and sloping landscape of the region permits maximum sun exposure which facilitates grape growth. Vineyards are planted in soils composed of mainly clay and silt loam on top of bedrock of limestone. The hardiness zone varies within the large north-to-south range from 5a to 6a.

The boundaries of the AVA share the unique geographical connection of all being part of the Paleozoic Plateau, also known as the Driftless Area, and therefore do not have the same type of vineyard soils as wine regions that were in areas that experienced glaciation during the last ice age.

Viticulture

In the Upper Mississippi Valley River AVA, viticultural techniques must be adapted to deal with the cold winters. After harvest, many wineries will take the grapevines down from their trellises. The vines are then pruned and buried under mulch. In the spring, just prior to budding, the vines are then guided back into the trellises to begin the next growing cycle  However, with new hybrid varietals developed by the University of Minnesota, these newer vines may stay on the trellises during the cold winters and pruned in February and March.

Grape varieties
The Upper Mississippi River Valley grows mainly hybrid grape varieties like Chardonel, Edelweiss, La Crosse, Marechal Foch, Frontenac, Marquette, and Saint Croix. Research at the University of Minnesota, influenced by the work of horticulturalist Elmer Swenson, have been developing new hybrid grapes that could better withstand the cold winter and ripen earlier.

See also

American wine
List of American Viticultural Areas
Illinois (wine)
Iowa (wine)
Minnesota (wine)
Wisconsin (wine)

References

External links
Appellations of Origin  from the TTB website
AVAs with links to detailed descriptions, from the Code of Federal Regulations located at a Cornell website
Interactive Google AVA map from American Winery Guide
 Upper Mississippi River Valley American Viticulture Area website
The Great River Road Wine Trail website

American Viticultural Areas
Illinois wine
Iowa wine
Minnesota wine
Wisconsin wine
2009 establishments in Illinois
2009 establishments in Iowa
2009 establishments in Minnesota
2009 establishments in Wisconsin
Driftless Area